Landscapes by Frank Weston Benson are one of the types of art work made by Frank Weston Benson. He also made portraits, waterscapes, wildlife, interiors and other works of art.

In 1888 Benson married Ellen Perry Peirson. Together they had four children: Eleanor (born 1890), George (born 1891), Elisabeth (born 1892) and Sylvia (born 1898). The Benson family spent 7 summers starting in 1893 in Newcastle, New Hampshire. Starting 1901 the Benson family stayed at Wooster Farm on New Haven Island on Penobscot Bay in Maine and in 1906 they bought the property. Benson enjoyed creating idyllic paintings of his family out of doors at their summer home in New Haven, Maine. One daughter noted that "Papa would often have us put on our best white dresses and then ask us to sit in the grass or play in the woods. We thought it was so silly and the maids made such a fuss when they saw the clothes afterwards."

Just at the turn of the century, Benson made Impressionist paintings of his children, Eleanor, Elisabeth, George and Sylvia at their summer home on New Haven Island in Maine. His work was well received by critics and collectors and won awards. Benson, eager to paint his children on sunny days, often asked his daughters to don their best white dresses and sit in the grass or play in the woods.

Between 1890 and 1898 Benson produced many en plein air landscape and seascape paintings of New Hampshire, including the Mount Monadnock, New Castle and Portsmouth regions.

Works

Notes

References

Bibliography

External links

Frank Weston Benson